Rachel Thompson (born 24 March 1964) is a Sierra Leonean middle-distance runner. She competed in the women's 1500 metres at the 1988 Summer Olympics.

References

1964 births
Living people
Athletes (track and field) at the 1988 Summer Olympics
Sierra Leonean female middle-distance runners
Olympic athletes of Sierra Leone
Place of birth missing (living people)